Numerical 3-dimensional matching is an NP-complete decision problem.
This problem is labeled as [SP16] in.

Example 
This instance has a solution, namely . However, there is at least one solution to this problem, which is the property we are interested in with decision problems.

Related problems 
Every instance of the Numerical 3-dimensional matching problem is an instance of both the 3-partition problem, and the 3-dimensional matching problem.

Proof of NP-completeness 
NP-completeness of the 3-partition problem is stated by Garey and Johnson in "Computers and Intractability; A Guide to the Theory of NP-Completeness", which references to this problem with the code [SP16]. It is done by a reduction from 3-dimensional matching via 4-partition.
To prove NP-completeness of the numerical 3-dimensional matching, the proof is similar, but a reduction from 3-dimensional matching via the numerical 4-dimensional matching problem should be used.

References 

Strongly NP-complete problems